The 2016–17 season is a season played by Anderlecht, a Belgian football club based in Anderlecht, Brussels. The season covers the period from 1 July 2016 to 30 June 2017. Anderlecht will be participating in the Belgian First Division A, Belgian Cup and the UEFA Champions League.

Match details
League positions are sourced by Statto, while the remaining information is referenced individually.

Belgian First Division A

Regular season

Championship play-offs

Belgian Cup

UEFA Champions League

Qualifying stage

UEFA Europa League

Qualifying stage

Group stage

Knockout phase

Appearances and goals
Source:
Numbers in parentheses denote appearances as substitute.
Players with names struck through and marked  left the club during the playing season.
Players with names in italics and marked * were on loan from another club for the whole of their season with Anderlecht.
Players listed with no appearances have been in the matchday squad but only as unused substitutes.
Key to positions: GK – Goalkeeper; DF – Defender; MF – Midfielder; FW – Forward

References

Anderlecht
R.S.C. Anderlecht seasons
Belgian football clubs 2016–17 season
Anderlecht
Belgian football championship-winning seasons